KFUN (1230 kHz) is a commercial AM radio station in Las Vegas, New Mexico. The station broadcasts a country music radio format and is owned by Baca Broadcasting LLC.

KFUN broadcasts at 1,000 watts non-directional.  It is also heard on 20 watt FM translator K279BW at 103.7 MHz.

Personalities
Camille Bohannon began her radio broadcasting career at KFUN. As a Highlands University student, she was asked to provide commentary about the university's homecoming parade by the local cable TV company's CATV-Channel 2, which evolved into a daily news program that was also carried by KFUN, which later hired her as a disc jockey.

References

External links

FUN
Country radio stations in the United States